Daniel Maynadier Henry (February 19, 1823 – August 31, 1899) was an American politician.

Early life
Henry was born near Cambridge, Maryland, and attended Cambridge Academy and St. John's College of Annapolis, Maryland.  He studied law, was admitted to the bar in 1844, and practiced in Cambridge.

Career
Henry began his political career as a member of the Maryland House of Delegates in 1846, and again later in 1849.  He also served in the Maryland State Senate in 1869.  In 1876, Henry was elected as a Democrat to the Forty-fifth, and in 1878 to the Forty-sixth Congresses, serving from March 4, 1877, to March 3, 1881.  During the forty-sixth congress, he served as chairman of the Committee on Accounts.

After his tenure in Congress, Henry continued the practice of law until his death.

Personal life
He was the uncle of Maryland Governor Henry Lloyd.

Death
Henry died in Cambridge.  He is interred in Christ Protestant Episcopal Church Cemetery.

References

1823 births
1899 deaths
Democratic Party members of the Maryland House of Delegates
Democratic Party Maryland state senators
People from Dorchester County, Maryland
Democratic Party members of the United States House of Representatives from Maryland
19th-century American politicians
Goldsborough family
Burials in Maryland